is a railway station on the Tokaido Shinkansen located in the city of Hashima, Gifu, Japan, operated by Central Japan Railway Company (JR Central). It is the sole Shinkansen station in Gifu Prefecture.

Lines
Shin-Hashima Station, the terminal of the Meitetsu Hashima Line is located in front of the Shinkansen station and provides railway access to the city of Gifu.

Station layout
The station has two island platforms serving four tracks, with two additional centre tracks for non-stop passing trains. The station has a Midori no Madoguchi staffed ticket office.

Platforms

History
The station opened on October 1, 1964. With the privatization and dissolution of Japanese National Railways on April 1, 1987, the station came under the control of JR Central.

Surrounding area
Gifu College of Nursing

See also
List of railway stations in Japan

External links

References

Yoshikawa, Fumio. Tokaido-sen 130-nen no ayumi. Grand-Prix Publishing (2002) .

Railway stations in Gifu Prefecture
Railway stations in Japan opened in 1964
Central Japan Railway Company
Tōkaidō Shinkansen
Hashima, Gifu